Nicolas Robert Raymond Dumont (born 13 December 1991) is a Belgian–French field hockey player.

Career

Club level
In club competition, Dumont plays for the Waterloo Ducks in the Belgian Hockey League.

Belgium
Nicolas Dumont made his debut for Belgium in 2013. The following year he competed at the 2012–13 Men's FIH World League in New Delhi.

France
After a three-year hiatus from international competition, Dumont made his debut for Les Bleus. His frist appearance for France came in a test series against Wales in Paris.

The year following his debut, Dumont became a regular inclusion in the national squad. He appeared in a number of test–series' and competitions, culminating with an appearance at the 2018 FIH World Cup in Bhubaneswar, where the team finished eighth.

He has since gone on to win a gold medal in the 2018–19 FIH Hockey Series in Le Touquet. He was most recently names in the national squad for season three of the FIH Pro League.

References

External links

1991 births
Living people
Belgian male field hockey players
French male field hockey players
Male field hockey defenders
2018 Men's Hockey World Cup players
Men's Belgian Hockey League players
Place of birth missing (living people)